Petrojack was a Norwegian offshore drilling rig operator. The company had two jackup rigs under order from Jurong Shipyard in Singapore, while it sold its two former rigs Petrojack I and Petrojack III to Maersk Drilling. The company was founded in 2004 and was listed on the Oslo Stock Exchange the next year. The largest shareholders were Petrolia Drilling (40%), Awilco Offshore (18%) and Sinvest (18%).

Stock Value 
In week 47 2009, Petrojack's stock value went up from 0,90 NOK per share to a maximum of 7,12 NOK per share. On the first day of this extreme rise, at 09:49, the stock was suspended because the share price rose 64% without any statement from the company itself. The stock was reopened 11 minutes later at 10:00.

Bankruptcy 
Petrojack reportedly went bankrupt toward the end of 2010.

References

Drilling rig operators
Service companies of Norway
Companies based in Oslo
Companies established in 2004
Petroleum industry in Norway